Turtle Diary is a 1985 British film directed by John Irvin and starring Glenda Jackson, Ben Kingsley, and Michael Gambon. Based on a screenplay adapted by Harold Pinter from Russell Hoban's novel Turtle Diary, the film is about "people rediscovering the joys of life and love".  The film contains elements of romance, comedy, and drama and has been described as a romantic comedy.

Synopsis
Two lonely Londoners - Neaera Duncan, a children's author (Glenda Jackson), and William Snow, a bookstore assistant (Ben Kingsley) - find common ground when visiting the sea turtles at London Zoo. Independently, each perceives that the turtles are unnaturally confined, and they hatch a plan with the assistance of zookeeper George Fairbairn (Michael Gambon) to smuggle them out and release them into the sea.

Their release of the turtles is a metaphor for their escape from their inhibitions.

Main cast
Glenda Jackson as Neaera Duncan, a "Popular children's author … fearing her creative talents have evaporated, [who] escapes into the dreamy world of sea turtles seeking inspiration in their beauty and grace."
Ben Kingsley as William Snow, "a humble assistant in a bookstore where he, too, dreams of the turtles."
Richard Johnson as Mr. Johnson, a neighbor of Neaera Duncan
Michael Gambon as George Fairbairn, the zookeeper charged with caring for the turtles
Jeroen Krabbé as Mr. Sandor, a neighbor of William Snow
Rosemary Leach as Mrs. Charlie Inchcliff, Williams Snow's landlady
Eleanor Bron as Miss Neap, a neighbor of William Snow
Harriet Walter as Harriet Simms, a colleague of William Snow at the bookstore
Nigel Hawthorne as the publisher of books by Neaera Duncan

Harold Pinter has a cameo role as a man in the bookshop where William and Harriet work.

Critical reception and analysis
In his 1985 review of the film for The Sunday Telegraph, David Castell observes that Pinter's screenplay concentrates on developing dialogue and plot, leaving clues for the actors to convey their characters' subtle emotional and psychological development: "It is hard to think of two actors better matched to play Pinter than Glenda Jackson and Ben Kingsley. They milk every nuance, point up every missed beat and relish each irony and repetition in the script. … Turtle Diary is a fine film that charts movingly the unnoticed despair of everyday lives, the sufferings of those who endure loneliness in silence."

The film grossed $2.2 million on its American theatrical release.

Home video 

The film was released on videocassette in 1985 by Vestron Video.  The film has not been released on DVD.

Notes

References
Castell, David.  Review of Turtle Diary. Sunday Telegraph 1 Dec. 1985.  Rpt. in HaroldPinter.org.  Harold Pinter, 2000–2003 [2009]. Accessed 22 March 2009.

External links

"Films by Harold Pinter: Turtle Diary, 1984" at HaroldPinter.org – The Official Website of International Playwright Harold Pinter (Includes production details and excerpt of film review by Castell.)

1985 films
British romantic comedy films
1985 romantic comedy films
Films with screenplays by Harold Pinter
Films directed by John Irvin
Films about turtles
Films set in zoos
1980s English-language films
1980s British films